The Woman with the Orchid (French: La femme à l'orchidée) is a 1952 French crime film directed by Raymond Leboursier and starring Tilda Thamar, Georges Rollin and Lucien Gallas.

Cast
 Tilda Thamar as Léna  
 Georges Rollin as Karl  
 Lucien Gallas as Commissaire Renaudin  
 Nada Fiorelli as Une danseuse  
 Hennery 
 Lucien Callamand 
 Félix Clément as Capitaine Wells  
 Gisèle Gray as Une amie de Luciano  
 Jacques-Elie Moreau 
 Jean Esplau 
 Fred Ellis  
 Michel Barbey as Walter  
 Georgette Plana

References

Bibliography 
 Rège, Philippe. Encyclopedia of French Film Directors, Volume 1. Scarecrow Press, 2009.

External links 
 

1952 crime films
French crime films
1952 films
1950s French-language films
Films directed by Raymond Leboursier
French black-and-white films
1950s French films